Toc H Institute of Science & Technology was established in 2002. It is located in Arakkunnam, Ernakulam, Kerala, India. The campus has three blocks:
 The Main Block (Aryabhatta Block) named after the Indian Scientist Aryabhata
  Einstein Block
 Visweshwarayya Block.

The college is headed by principal Preethi Thekkath and follows Bloom's revised taxonomy for education. Dignitaries including former president A.P.J Abdul Kalam, I.S.R.O Chief Dr.G. Madhavan Nair have visited the college.

Recognition
The institute is approved by the All India Council for Technical Education (AICTE), New Delhi and the Government of Kerala and is affiliated to APJ Abdul Kalam Technological University. The college is accredited by the National Assessment and Accreditation Council (NAAC). It is one among the 16 engineering colleges in Kerala with National Board of Accreditation (NBA) Accredited Programs in Civil Engineering, Computer Science & Engineering, Electronics & Communications Engineering & Mechanical Engineering, under the self financing category.

Organization
The college offers BTech courses in the following disciplines:
 Mechanical engineering
 Electronics and communication engineering
 Computer science and engineering
 Information technology
 Electrical and electronics engineering
 Civil engineering
 Safety & fire engineering
 Robotics & automation

This institution offers MBA and MTech. Offered MTech courses are:

 Thermal Engineering 
 VLSI & Embedded Systems
 Wireless Technology
 Power Electronics
 Computer science with specialization in Data Science.
 Construction Engineering & Management
 Network Computing

External links
 

Engineering colleges in Ernakulam district
Educational institutions established in 2002
2002 establishments in Kerala